UTC−08:30 is an identifier for a time offset from UTC of −08:30.

History
This offset was used in Pitcairn Islands until April 26, 1998. On April 27, the time zone was changed to UTC−08:00, so after 23:59:59, it became 00:30:00.

References

UTC offsets